The Thorvaldsen Medal (Danish: Thorvaldsens Medalje, Thorvaldsen Medaillen) is awarded annually with few exceptions to a varying number of recipients by the Royal Danish Academy of Fine Arts and is its highest distinction within the visual arts. It is named after the sculptor Bertel Thorvaldsen.

The medal was founded in 1837 as the Exhibition Medal and awarded for talented works in the Charlottenborg Spring Exhibition in the Charlottenborg Palace. In 1866, it was renamed the Thorvaldsen Exhibition Medal, and from 1923 it has been known under its current name.

Medal design
The medal is executed in silver and designed by the sculptor Christen Christensen (1806–45) in connection with Thorvaldsen's homecoming from Rome in 1838.

Recipients

Exhibition Medal recipients

Thorvaldsen Medal recipients

See also
 Art of Denmark
 C. F. Hansen Medal
 Eckersberg Medal
 List of European art awards
 Prizes named after people

References

External links
Full listing of Thorvaldsen Medal winners from Akademiraadet

Danish art awards
Awards established in 1837
Royal Danish Academy of Fine Arts
Bertel Thorvaldsen